Adityapur railway station is a railway station in Seraikela Kharsawan district, Jharkhand. Its code is ADTP. It serves Adityapur colony of jamshedpur city. It has two platforms and handles around 33 trains each day. Most westbound and northbound trains but none of the train originate at Adityapur railway station.

Currently, the station is undergoing major re-development work by Rail Vikas Nigam Limited. This Rs 2.30 crore Project will include a double storeyed building spread across 10,674 sq. ft. area. The new building will have an air-conditioned retiring room, a first-class waiting room, a counter for booking tickets and an automated teller machine kiosk, among others, under one roof. Apart from this, an RPF post, a GRP outpost, a parcel room and a godown will also come up. A WiFi facility and a battery-operated vehicle for ferrying passengers within the platform are also in the offing. Besides, a foot over-bridge at the station and extension of the platform will also be done as part of the renovation project. The project is expected to be completed by the end of 2023.

After completion of the project, current Platform No. 1, 2 & 3 of the station will be renumbered as 3, 4 & 5.

Line and location
Adityapur is located on the Howrah–Nagpur–Mumbai line of the Indian Railways.

References

External links 
 

Chakradharpur railway division
Railway stations in Seraikela Kharsawan district
Transport in Jamshedpur